The Eliteserien, until 1991 known as the 1. divisjon and between 1991 and 2016 known as Tippeligaen, has employed a system of play-off qualification to determine promotion and relegation with the 1. divisjon (until 1991 the 2. divisjon). Various varieties have been in place since the system was introduced at the end of the 1972 season, but only one team has been promoted per year. The play-offs have always supplemented a system of direct promotion and relegation of two teams. The play-offs have been wavered twice, in the 1994 and 2011 seasons, when the top league was expanded to fourteen and sixteen teams, respectively.

Sogndal have participated nine times, more than any other team. Start (four times) and Stabæk (twice) are the only teams to have participated more than once and always won. The least successful teams who have participated three times or more and never won the tournament are Pors (four times), Sandefjord and Ull/Kisa (both three times). Teams from the top league have participated 35 times, and have succeeded at retaining their place in 20 occasions.

Format
Play-offs were introduced in the 1972, when the 1. divisjon was expanded from ten to twelve teams. The 2. divisjon consisted of two conferences, and the winners of each conference were promoted directly. The runners-up met the winner of a conference from Northern Norway, with the three teams playing a single round-robin to determine the third and final promotion spot. Three teams were relegated from the 1. divisjon. This system remained for seven years, before the separate conferences for Northern Norway were abolished. From 1979 the play-offs were played as a two-tier match between the two conference runners-up, a system which was used for two seasons.

From 1981 the system returned to a three-team single round robin, although this time the two 2. divisjon runners-up met the team finishing tenth in the 1. divisjon. The format remained for thirteen years, with six top level teams succeeding in retaining their place. No play-off was played in 1994, as the top flight was increased to fourteen teams and both the winners and runners-up of both 1. divisjon conferences were promoted, while only two top flight teams were relegated.

From 1995 the play-off solely involved a two-tier match between the runners-up of the 1. divisjon conferences, with three teams from the top flight meeting relegation. This system remained for two years, before 1997, when the 1. divisjon was merged to a single conference. For twelve years the play-off was played as a two-tier game between the team finishing twelfth in the top flight and the team finishing third in the 1. divisjon. In this period the top level teams defended their positions nine times, including every year from 2001 through 2006.

From 2009 the play-off has been played as a knock-out tournament. The first two years saw the teams ranked three through five in the 1. divisjon meet the team ranked twelfth in the top flight in a two-round knock-out, with a single match in the first round and double match in the second round. In 2009 the top flight was extended to sixteen teams: three teams were promoted and only one relegated. In 2011, no play-off was carried out. From 2012 the play-offs returned as a three-round knock-out tournament. The teams ranked three to six in the 1. divisjon played each other in a two-round, single-match knock-out tournament, with the winner facing the fourteenth-placed top flight team in a two-legged decisive final.

By season

The following is a list of seasons, listing the winning team, the relegated team should the top level contestant fail to win, and teams failing to be promoted.

By club
The following is a list of clubs which have participated, stating the municipality they are from and the number of seasons they have participated in the play-off. It further states the number of times and years the teams have won the play-off, been relegated and not been promoted.

References

 
Play-offs
Norwegian First Division
1972 establishments in Norway
Recurring sporting events established in 1972